Domenica Ananias Cancino (born 18 August 1998) is a Chilean field hockey player.

Ananias has represented Chile at both junior and senior levels. She made her junior debut at the 2016 Pan-Am Junior Championship, and her senior debut two years later in a test series against Canada.

References

1998 births
Living people
Chilean female field hockey players
Competitors at the 2022 South American Games
South American Games gold medalists for Chile
South American Games medalists in field hockey
20th-century Chilean women
21st-century Chilean women